Dicrogonatus gardineri (common name: Gardiner's giant mite) is an extinct species of mite in the order Holothyrida, endemic to the Seychelles island of Mahé, where it was found in 1909. No other sightings have been recorded since, despite efforts to find it again in 2002 and 2011–12. This species became extinct due to the deterioration of habitation following the introduction of the cinnamon tree Cinnamomum verum.

References

External links 

Parasitiformes
Extinct invertebrates since 1500
Extinct arachnids
Extinct animals of Africa